Moregeri  is a village in the southern state of Karnataka, India. It is located in the Hagaribommanahalli taluk of Vijayanagara district in Karnataka.

Demographics
 India census, Moregeri had a population of 5146 with 2593 males and 2553 females.

See also
 Bellary
 Districts of Karnataka

References

External links
 http://Bellary.nic.in/

Villages in Bellary district